"What the Butler Saw" is the twenty-second episode of the fourth series of the 1960s cult British spy-fi television series The Avengers, starring Patrick Macnee and Diana Rigg. It was first broadcast by Scottish Television on Tuesday 22 February 1966. ABC Weekend Television, who commissioned the show, broadcast it in its own regions four days later on Saturday 26 February. The episode was directed by Bill Bain and written by Philip Levene.

Plot
A butler asks for a pay rise and another butler, Benson, is hailed and hands a gun on a plate to a hidden man in a chair to kill the butler, whose body is then dropped in a lake.

Steed visits a barber for a shave.  His barber reports that one of three high officers is a spy, and is stabbed dead.  Steed investigates the disappearance of the butler in disguises that spoof the styles of the various services.  Commander Red wears a full beard, and Major White a small mustache.  Squadron Leader Blue sports a great bushy mustache and spouts breezy acronyms.

Brigadier "Percy" Ponsonby-Goddard informs Steed he is unwell and asks him to return at a later date.  His butler is later discovered stabbed.  Mrs Peel visits Group Capt. "Georgie" Miles, a suspect who is susceptible to a pretty face, to learn more about him.  She seduces him with photographs of herself, and is invited to dinner.

Steed visits the training academy which the murdered butlers attended and discovers that Hubert Hemming is both head of the academy and under the employ of Miles. Steed enrolls. He polishes shoes, presses trousers, and learns to adhere to their motto, "Brighter, Better, More Beautiful Butling". He impresses Hemming, but Hemming's own butler Benson is suspicious and knows Steed to be an imposter. Hemming is later working for the absent Miles; Hemming is lured away and killed by Benson, who returns the gun to the hidden man in the chair. He promises to kill Steed, who discovers Hemming's body.

Benson holds Steed at gunpoint and informs him that his false references make him trustworthy.  Benson sends Steed to butler for Miles, whilst Miles is forcibly attempting to romance Mrs Peel. Later, Steed and several other butlers get instructions to pour wine over Miles and the others attending a private conference. Benson fetches their jackets. Steed and Mrs Peel discover that Benson has hidden recorders in the jackets for his real boss, the hidden man in the chair, now revealed as no high officer at all. He makes the usual villainous mistake of trying to overpower Mrs Peel in hand-to-hand combat, and the cheerful victors  fly off in a helicopter.

Cast
 Patrick Macnee as John Steed
Diana Rigg as Emma Peel
Thorley Walters as Hubert Hemming
John Le Mesurier as Benson
Denis Quilley as Group Capt. "Georgie" Miles
Kynaston Reeves as Major General Ponsonby-Goddard
Howard Marion-Crawford as Brigadier "Percy" Ponsonby-Goddard 
Humphrey Lestocq as Vice Admiral Willows
Ewan Hooper as Sergeant Moran
Leon Sinden as Squadron Leader Hogg
David Swift as Barber
Norman Scace as Reeves
Peter Hughes as Walters
Pamela Davies as the WREN

Production
Production for the episode was completed from mid-late December 1965 to early January 1966.

Reception
Lamp stands shaped  Minoan bulls used to decorate Miles's bachelor pad, designed by Harry Pottle, started retailing in a department in London six months after the episode was aired and have been cited as having "overtones of virility and eroticism and evidently considered highly saleable".

References

External links

Episode overview on The Avengers Forever! website
Watch episode

The Avengers (season 4) episodes
1966 British television episodes